The Omanawa Caldera is inferred by an area of magnetic anomaly that exists to the north-west of the Rotorua Caldera.  It is also located to the north west of the present boundary of the modern Taupō Volcanic Zone but its existence would be compatible with activity in the area of intersection of Taupo Rift and Hauraki Rift before 1.9 million years ago. The area of the caldera is covered by Mamaku Ignambrite from the Mamaku eruption of 240,000 years ago that formed the Rotorua Caldera. Eruptions from the Omanawa Caldera would explain formations such as the Waiteariki ignimbrite which covers much of the Bay of Plenty and forms the bulk of the Whakamarama Plateau. This would date the major caldera formation to 2.1 million years ago. However, there are at least eight large eruptions that occurred in the Tauranga Volcanic Centre between 2.4 and 1.9 million years ago and at this time which ones relate to this caldera can not be definite. However to date there is no other obvious closer inferred volcanic structure to assign a super volcanic eruption to, so at least some of these eruptions are likely to be associated with the Omanawa Caldera magnetic anomaly.

References

Rift volcanoes
Taupō Volcanic Zone
Supervolcanoes
VEI-7 volcanoes
Pleistocene calderas
Calderas of New Zealand
Volcanoes of the Bay of Plenty Region